Rembert Wallace Patrick (1909–1967) was a historian, longtime University of Florida history professor, and prolific author of works on Florida's history, particularly the Reconstruction Era. The Florida Historical Society gives out an award named in his honor.

Bibliography
The reconstruction of the Nation (10 editions)
Jefferson Davis and his cabinet
Florida under five flags
The fall of Richmond
Florida fiasco; rampant rebels on the Georgia-Florida border, 1810-1815
Aristocrat in uniform, General Duncan L. Clinch
The story of Florida
History of Florida (textbook) This country of oursTwenty-five stories complete in themselves (a collection on the discovery and development of America)Race relations in the SouthReferences

Further readingRembert Wallace Patrick'' by Herbert J Doherty
 Papers, 1909-1961 by Julien Chandler Yonge
 Records, 1923-1982 by Florida Historical Society
 Fletcher Melvin Green papers, 1898-1980 (bulk 1935-1965) by Fletcher Melvin Green

1909 births
1967 deaths
University of Florida faculty
20th-century American historians
20th-century American male writers
American male non-fiction writers